This is a list of episodes for the fifth season (1979–80) of the NBC television series Quincy, M.E..

In this season, Donald Bellisario and R. A. Cinader take over as executive producers, and the opening theme is slightly rearranged.

Episodes

External links
 

1979 American television seasons
1980 American television seasons